Pluralist Democracy Party (Çoğulcu Demokrasi Partisi; ÇDP for short) is a political party of Turkey founded on 15 August 2014. Faruk Arslandok is the general chairman. It defends the brotherhood and freedom of people and describes itself as a "non-terroristic" alternative to HDP. It is a party founded by Circassians in Turkey, and is also known as the "Circassian Solidarity Party" in unofficial media. ÇDP entered the June 2015 general elections in Turkey with independent candidates.

References 

Political parties established in 2014